Capital Hill is an album by saxophonist Buck Hill which was recorded in 1989 and released on the Muse label.

Reception

The AllMusic review by Scott Yanow stated "this Muse CD is mostly  standards and puts the emphasis on the boppish side of the tenor's style ... Hill romps throughout the program".

Track listing
 "Tenor Madness" (Sonny Rollins) – 4:12
 "Chelsea Bridge" (Billy Strayhorn) – 7:38
 "Stompin' at the Savoy" (Edgar Sampson, Benny Goodman, Chick Webb, Andy Razaf) – 8:21
 "Jazz Ballad" (Buck Hill) – 6:02
 "On the Trail" (Ferde Grofé) – 6:27
 "Someone to Watch Over Me" (George Gershwin, Ira Gershwin) – 5:45
 "Hail to the Redskins" (Barnee Breeskin, Corinne Griffith) – 4:59
 "Vierd Blues" (John Coltrane) – 6:44 Additional track on CD release

Personnel
Buck Hill – tenor saxophone
Barry Harris – piano 
Ray Drummond – bass 
Freddie Waits – drums

References

Muse Records albums
Buck Hill (musician) albums
1990 albums
Albums recorded at Van Gelder Studio